St. Mary of the Presentation Church is a church located in Diocese of Rome, in Lido di Ostia Levante District, via Torrevechia.

Pope Benedict XVI instituted it as the seat of the cardinal title of S. Mariæ de Presentatione.

List of Cardinal Protectors
 Francisco Robles Ortega 24 November 2007 – present

References

External links
 Santa Maria della Presentazione 

Titular churches
Rome Q. XXXIV Lido di Ostia Levante